Alexandros Amanatidis (born 12 May 1987) is a Cypriot male weightlifter, competing in the 77 kg category and representing Cyprus at international competitions. He participated at the 2010 Commonwealth Games in the 77 kg event.

Major competitions

References

External links 
 

1987 births
Living people
Cypriot male weightlifters
Commonwealth Games competitors for Cyprus
Weightlifters at the 2010 Commonwealth Games
Weightlifters at the 2014 Commonwealth Games
Place of birth missing (living people)